Louis Nel (born 2 February 1941) is a South African former cricketer. He played in twelve first-class matches for Eastern Province between 1963/64 and 1965/66.

See also
 List of Eastern Province representative cricketers

References

External links
 

1941 births
Living people
South African cricketers
Eastern Province cricketers
People from Somerset East
Cricketers from the Eastern Cape